Surrey County may refer to:

 Surrey County, Jamaica
 Surrey, England

See also
 Surry County (disambiguation)